Vault is a commercial, proprietary version control system by SourceGear LLC which markets its product as a replacement for Microsoft's Visual Source Safe.

Vault uses Microsoft SQL Server as a back end database and provides atomic commits to the version control system.

The tool is built on top of Microsoft .NET.

Fortress, originally an application lifecycle management (ALM) product marketed separately for use with Vault, was later merged into Vault releases.

Third party products have been designed to be integrated with Vault such as OnTime, FogBugz, TeamCity, and SmartBear CodeCollaborator.

See also
Revision control
List of revision control software

References

External links
 Vault, SourceGear
 Vault Development Blog
 Asp alliance review
 Reasons to switch from SourceSafe to Vault by Eric Sink

Proprietary version control systems
C Sharp software